

List of Rulers of the Akan state of Akuapem

References 

https://www.myjoyonline.com/news/regional/photos-of-akuapemhenes-enstoolment-amidst-heavy-security/
https://www.ghanaweb.com/GhanaHomePage/NewsArchive/Okuapehemaa-installs-a-New-Okuapehene-607577
https://www.pulse.com.gh/news/local/police-provide-security-as-akuapemhene-is-enstooled-despite-ban-on-public-gathering/s1rqe1g

See also
Akan people
Ghana
Gold Coast
Lists of incumbents
Akropong–Akuapem

Lists of African monarchs
Rulers